Richard Stockton (April 17, 1764March 7, 1828) was a lawyer who represented New Jersey in the United States Senate and later served in the United States House of Representatives.  He was the first U.S. Attorney for the District of New Jersey, holding that office from 1789 to 1791, and ran unsuccessfully for vice president in the 1820 election as a member of the Federalist Party, which did not nominate a candidate for president.

Life
Stockton was born in Princeton, New Jersey, the son of Richard Stockton, a signer of the Declaration of Independence. He was tutored privately, and graduated from the College of New Jersey (now Princeton University) in 1779. He studied law, was admitted to the bar in 1784 and commenced practice in Princeton.

Stockton was a presidential elector in the 1792 and 1800 presidential elections. He was elected as a Federalist to the United States Senate to fill the vacancy caused by the resignation of Frederick Frelinghuysen and served from November 12, 1796, to March 4, 1799, but declined to be a candidate for reelection. He was an unsuccessful candidate for Governor of New Jersey in 1801, 1803, and 1804. He was elected as a Federalist to the Thirteenth Congress, serving from March 4, 1813, to March 3, 1815, and declined to be a candidate for renomination to the Fourteenth Congress.

Stockton was elected a member of the American Antiquarian Society in 1815.

After leaving Congress, he resumed the practice of his profession. He died at Morven, near Princeton, and was interred in Princeton Cemetery in Princeton.

Family
In 1788, Stockton married Mary Field (1766–1837).  They were the parents of nine children, including Mary Field, Richard, Julia, Robert Field, Horatio, Caroline, Samuel Witham, William Bradford, and Annis.

His brother Lucius Horatio Stockton served as U.S. Attorney for the District of New Jersey.

His son Commodore Robert F. Stockton was the Military Governor of California who defeated the Mexican army in 1846. He later became a senator from New Jersey like his father before him.

His daughter Annie Stockton was the first wife of U.S. Senator John Renshaw Thomson.

References

External links

Biographical Directory of the United States Congress, 1774-2005: The Continental Congress, September 5, 1774, to October 21, 1788, and the Congress of the United States, from the First Through the One Hundred Eighth Congresses, March 4, 1789, to January 3, 2005, Inclusive. p. 1983  United States Congress. U.S. Government Printing Office, (2005)  
Richard Stockton (1764-1828) at The Political Graveyard

|-

|-

|-

1764 births
1828 deaths
Burials at Princeton Cemetery
Federalist Party members of the United States House of Representatives from New Jersey
Federalist Party United States senators
Members of the American Antiquarian Society
New Jersey lawyers
People from Princeton, New Jersey
Princeton University alumni
Stockton family of New Jersey
United States Attorneys for the District of New Jersey
United States senators from New Jersey
1820 United States vice-presidential candidates
1792 United States presidential electors
1800 United States presidential electors